Ahmet Erdoğan (born October 24, 1986) is a Turkish professional basketball player. He currently playing for Aliağa Petkim. He is 1.87 m (6 ft 1.50 in) tall and 75 kg (165 lbs) weight. He plays the point guard position.

External links
TBLStat.net Profile

1986 births
Living people
Aliağa Petkim basketball players
Karşıyaka basketball players
Oyak Renault basketball players
Point guards
Turkish men's basketball players
21st-century Turkish people